Russell Shealy (born September 26, 1999) is an American professional soccer player. He played college soccer for Syracuse University.

Playing career
Russell Shealy was born to Dr. Jim Shealy and Maureen Shealy in Cartersville, Georgia and attended Darlington School in Rome, Georgia.

During high school, he played for the Concorde Fire soccer club, Atlanta United Academy (Atlanta United 2), and US Youth Soccer.

After high school, Shealy was rated by Top Drawer Soccer as the No. 102 recruit in the country and he was recruited by Wofford College and the University of Maryland. In his junior year of high school, he committed to Wofford but soon decided to join Maryland squad instead.

College
During his freshman year in 2018, Shealy redshirted at Maryland, serving as the main backup behind Dayne St. Clair on Maryland's National Championship team. When St. Clair left early for MLS, Shealy was named the first-choice keeper at the start of the 2019 season, but lost the spot to German Niklas Neumann.

In 2020, Shealy transferred to Syracuse and made his first start for SU men's soccer after waiting for only three games. Michael Flynn was his position coach at Syracuse. He was a Communication and Rhetorical Studies major at Syracuse.

In 2022, he set program records for goalkeeper minutes in a season (2,220) and goalkeeper wins in a season (18–2–4). Started 24 of the 25 matches on the way to the 2022 NCAA National Championship title and tallied 16 shutouts in 43 games, including posting 10 shutouts, career-highs in saves (72), goals against average (0.73), save percentage (0.800), and clean sheets (10).

At the end of the 2022 season, the team won the national championship and Shealy was named 2022 Men's College Cup's Defensive Most Outstanding Player.

Shealy saved three shots in the NCAA National Championship match against Indiana.

Semi-pro clubs
Shealy played for National Premier Soccer League side Georgia Revolution in 201 and USL League Two side Reading United AC in 2022.

LA Galaxy 
On December 21, 2022, Shealy was selected by the LA Galaxy as the 52nd overall pick in the 2023 MLS SuperDraft.

He is represented by ProConnect Soccer, soccer agency.

Honors
Syracuse University

 Atlantic Division regular season: 2022
 ACC men's soccer tournament: 2022
 NCAA Division I men's soccer tournament: 2022

Individual
 Men's College Cup Defensive Most Outstanding Player: 2022
 NCAA All-Tournament Team: 2022
ACC All-Tournament Team & Most valuable player: 2022
 ACC All-Conference Second Team: 2022
 United Soccer Coaches' All-South Region Third Team

References

External links
 Syracuse bio

1999 births
Living people
People from Cartersville, Georgia
Soccer players from Georgia (U.S. state)
American soccer players
Association football goalkeepers
Atlanta United 2 players
Darlington School alumni
LA Galaxy draft picks
Maryland Terrapins men's soccer players
National Premier Soccer League players
Reading United A.C. players
Syracuse Orange men's soccer players
Syracuse University College of Visual and Performing Arts alumni
USL League Two players